Champús is a drink popular in Peru, Ecuador and southwest Colombia, made with maize, fruits such as lulo (also known as naranjilla), pineapple, quince or guanábana, sweetened with panela and seasoned with cinnamon, cloves and orange tree leaves.

In Peru, it is drunk warm, and apple, guanábana and quince are used instead of lulo. It is sold in the streets by a champusera, a typical figure of Lima's landscape, generally Afro-Peruvian, who passes down the recipe to younger generations.

In Ecuador, it is prepared with maize flour, panela and green leaves from the lemon tree. It is a drink in funeral rites in November or the funerals of adults because the indigenous tradition considers it a favorite of the dead.

In Colombia, crushed maize is used, in addition to panela, lulo, pineapple, cinnamon, cloves and leaves of the orange tree. In the regions of the south, such as the Departments of Nariño and Cauca, it is considered mainly a drink for Christmas. In Nariño it is prepared also with leaves of cedrón and congona. In the Department of Valle del Cauca it is served very cold it is popular at any time.

In some regions of Peru and southern Colombia, the drink is made with mote, cooked maize that makes the champús thicker; in these regions, it is consumed as dessert.

Origin
The origin of the word champús remains unknown due to the lack of registered information. However, there are certain theories that make this type of drink not only a Colombian drink but one made in different parts of South America like Ecuador and Peru. 

In 1960, Daniel Guevara in “Expresión ritual de comidas y bebidas ecuatorianas”, explains that champús in Ecuador is a drink used by indigenous tribes in funeral rituals. Since it is a traditional indigenous drink, like chicha and guarapo, it is said to share the same origin.

According to the “Diccionario of Vallecaucanismos” of Leonardo Tascón, Champús is a Spanish word that means “something done wrong, a mixture of everything”. He explains that the Spanish gave this name to the drink due to the unpleasant mixture of many things. 

Others consider that it is an African word. In “Canto Negro” (2004), Nicomedes Santa Cruz finds this lady in traditional Afro-Peruvian songs. The problem is that, any of the defenders of the African thesis propose a word in the African language to relate to the origin of Champús. 

“A champucera is a lady that placed herself in the plots with a lamp of tallow candles and an Afro-Descendant boy recited a copla to proclaim the sale of the champús”. “Seminario de la Historia de la Cocina Peruana” (2007). 

Diaz (2018), believes that the most convincing theory about the origin of the word comes from the Quechua, because “chapuy” means “to make dough” which, in fact, is the main ingredient of the drink.  

Ceballos; Micanquer; Perez; Lasso and Zambrano (2011) explain that, in Colombia, the Champús is a drink that comes from low- income families. They also explain that the champús gathers the energy of the corn, the sweetness of the sugar cane, the strength and the aroma of the cloves and the cinnamon as well as the secret touch from the orange leaves. Nowadays, it is a drink served all year long but the authors explained that this drink is made for Christmas celebrations and is also considered a dessert. 

According to the authors above, they describe that this type of drink cures both thirst and hunger. It is a refreshing drink that at first might not look pleasant. There is a famous place in Cali where they sell this delicious drink, it is called “El Champús de Lola”. This establishment has run for almost 30 years and has passed to younger generations which had worked with the original recipe. Despite the existence of several venues that sell the same drink, customers consider that the best preparation of the champús come from the lower-income suburbs which are sold on the streets sometimes with the purpose of raising funds. 

This drink goes well with lunch food and savoury snacks; it brings families together.

Cooking Process
To prepare champús you need to cook the corn for approximately an hour. When soft, extract one cup of the corn and once ground put it back to the mixture. On the side prepare the caramel with panela, orange leaves, cloves, and cinnamon. After that, put this caramel with the corn already prepared and add the pulp of the lulo and the diced pineapple. Stir and serve with ice.

Reference

Tascon, L (1961). Quechuismos usados en Colombia. Editorial Norma. Colombia.
Guevara, D (1960). Expresión ritual de comidas y bebidas ecuatorianas. Editorial Universitaria. Mexico. 
Santa Cruz, N (1971). Ritmos negros del Perú. Editorial Losada. Argentina. 
Villavicencio, M (2007). Seminario de la Historia de la Cocina Peruana. Universidad de San Martín de Porres. Peru. 

Peruvian cuisine
Colombian cuisine
Ecuadorian cuisine
Non-alcoholic drinks
Maize-based drinks